Alberto Delgado may refer to:

 Alberto Delgado (jockey) (born 1964), American jockey
 Alberto Delgado (Cuban footballer) (born 1978), Cuban footballer
 Alberto Delgado (Spanish footballer) (born 1991), Spanish footballer

See also 
 Alberto Delgado Airport, an airport serving Trinidad, Cuba